Causey's Mill is a historic grist mill located in Causey's Mill Park at Newport News, Virginia. It was built in 1866, and is a small two-story wood-frame building originally supported by a brick and concrete foundation.  It retains its original machinery and is one of the two last surviving grist mills on the Peninsula.  The mill operated until nearly the 20th century. In 2011, the mill was moved about 75 feet from its original location away from the shore of the Mariners' Lake and set on a new foundation.

It was listed on the National Register of Historic Places in 2008.

References

External links
"Causey's Mill On the Move"

Grinding mills on the National Register of Historic Places in Virginia
Industrial buildings completed in 1866
Buildings and structures in Newport News, Virginia
National Register of Historic Places in Newport News, Virginia
Grinding mills in Virginia
1866 establishments in Virginia